Buckeye is an unincorporated community in Matagorda County, Texas, located 9 miles southwest of Bay City, the county seat of Matagorda County.

History
J. W. Stoddard and A. A. Plotner, the founders of the Plotner-Stoddard Irrigation Canal Company, who were born in Ohio, decided to name the town after their home state. The water came from the Colorado River and was able to irrigate 30,000 acres of land. A school was set up for employee's children and a post office opened in 1907. In 1908, train service came to Buckeye (the St. Louis, Brownsville and Mexico).

The town grew to 100 people by 1914. By 1940, there was only one business in town and a population of just 25. (The same census in 990 and 2000). By 1949 the school consolidated with the Tidehaven Independent School District and the post office closed in 1971.

References

External links
History of Buckeye, Texas

Unincorporated communities in Matagorda County, Texas